California's 17th congressional district is a congressional district in the U.S. state of California that is currently represented by Ro Khanna. It is located in the South Bay and East Bay regions of the San Francisco Bay Area.

The district includes parts of Alameda County and Santa Clara County. It encompasses the cities of Sunnyvale, Cupertino, Santa Clara, Milpitas, Newark, the majority of Fremont, and the northernmost and westernmost parts of San Jose. The district includes the campus of Santa Clara University and the corporate headquarters of Apple Inc, Intel Corp., and Yahoo. It is the only majority-Asian district in the contiguous United States. It is also the wealthiest Congressional district in the United States.

From 2003 to 2013, the district covered all of Monterey and San Benito counties, as well as part of Santa Cruz County. It included all of the coastal communities surrounding Monterey Bay, the city of Salinas, and the vast majority of the Salinas Valley. The district was mostly unchanged during the 2021 redistricting.

Recent results from statewide elections

Composition

As of the 2020 redistricting, California's 17th congressional district takes up the Tri-City area of the San Francisco Bay Area. It takes up the western borders of Alameda and Santa Clara Counties.

Alameda County is split between this district and the 14th district. They are partitioned by Mission Peak Regional Park, Witherly Ln, Mission Blvd, Washington Blvd, Farallon Cmn, Paseo Padre Parkway, Grimmer Blvd, Blacow Rd, Omar St, Butano Park Dr, Farina Ln, Nimitz Freeway, Highway 84. The 17th district takes in the south side of the city of Fremont, and the city of Newark.

Santa Clara County is split between this district, the 16th district, and the 18th district. The 17th and 16th are partitioned by Stevens Creek Blvd, Santana Row, Olsen Dr, S Winchester Blvd, Williams Rd, Eden Ave, Lexington Dr, Valley Forge Way, Gleason Ave, Moreland Way, Payne Ave, Saratoga Ave, Doyle Rd, Highway G2, Royal Ann Dr, Wisteria Way, Rainbow Dr, Highway 85, S De Anza Blvd, Prospect Rd, Fremont Older Open Space, Permanente Creek, Highway 280, N Foothill Blvd, Homestead Rd, Stevens Creek, W EL Camino Real, Magritte Way, Highway G6, Highway 101, and Enterprise Way. The 17th and 18th are partitioned by Steven’s Creek Blvd, Di Salvo Ave, Bellerose Dr, Forest Ave, Wabash Ave, W San Carlos St, Race St, The Alameda, University Ave, Elm St, Highway 82, Newhall St, Morse St, Idaho St, Alameda Ct, Sherwood Ave, Hamline St, Highway 880, Highway 101, McKee Rd, Toyon Ave, Penitencia Creek Rd, Canon Vista Ave, Crothers Rd, Alum Rock Park, Sierra Rd, Felter Rd, Weller Rd. The 17th district takes in the north side of the city of San Jose, the cities of Milpitas, Santa Clara, Sunnyvale, and Cupertino.

Cities & CDP with 10,000 or more people
 San Jose - 1,013,240
 Fremont - 230,504
 Sunnyvale - 155,805
 Santa Clara - 127,647
 Milpitas - 80,273
 Cupertino - 57,820
 Newark - 47,529

List of members representing the district

Election results

1932

1934

1936

1938

1940

1942 (Special)
Democrat Cecil R. King won the special election to replace fellow Democrat Lee E. Geyer, who died in office. Data for this special election is not available.

1942

1944

1946

1948

1950

1952

1954

1956

1958

1960

1962

1964

1966

1968

1970

1972

1974

1976

1978

1980

1982

1984

1986

1988

1990

1992

1993 (Special)

1994

1996

1998

2000

2002

2004

2006

2008

2010

2012

2014

2016

2018

2020

Historical district boundaries

See also
List of United States congressional districts

References

External links
GovTrack.us: California's 17th congressional district
RAND California Election Returns: District Definitions
California Voter Foundation map - CD17

17
Government of Monterey County, California
Government of San Benito County, California
Government of Santa Cruz County, California
Constituencies established in 1933
1933 establishments in California